"Goodbye" is a 1999 song by British hard rock band Def Leppard from their Euphoria album. The single reached number 54 on the UK Singles Chart.

Track listing

Enhanced CD: Bludgeon Riffola - Mercury / 562 289-2 (UK) / Part 1
 "Goodbye" (the video)
 "Burnout"
 "Immortal"

Enhanced CD: Bludgeon Riffola - Mercury / 562 288-2 (UK) / Part 2
 "Goodbye"
 "Who Do You Love?" (Ian Hunter cover)
 "When Love and Hate Collide" (the video)

Charts

References

Def Leppard songs
1999 singles
Rock ballads
Songs written by Rick Savage
1998 songs
British pop rock songs
Music videos directed by Dave Meyers (director)